Fantastique (from ) is a pop music duo of "typical Dutchmen": round-faced Dick Dam and blue-eyed Astrid Leuwener from the city of Haarlem in the west of the Netherlands. It was formed by famous Dutch producers' team Cat Music (Geertjan J. Hessing, Aart Mol, Elmer F. Veerhoff, Erwin van Prehn, Cees R. Bergman) well-known till 1979 as glam rock/teenybopper band Catapult and then also as The Monotones.

These "Ottawan-like" electronic dance tracks they wrote for Fantastique ("Mama Told Me", "Costa Blanca", etc.) topped charts in many countries in the early 1980s; in October 1981 on Dutch Top 40 singles chart its highest number was 5. In 1986 Mama Told Me spent 13 weeks and reached number 84 on the official UK singles chart. There are a lot of remixes of "Mama Told Me" issued long after Fantastique drifted into oblivion, even it was used as a part of soundtrack of Dutch movie I am Joep Meloen (1981).

External links
An article about Fantastique in LD Catalogue music directory

Dutch pop music groups